{{DISPLAYTITLE:Gamma2 Normae}}

Gamma2 Normae, Latinized from γ2 Nor, is the brightest star in the southern constellation of Norma. Its apparent magnitude is 4.02 – making it a faint star but visible to the naked eye. Based upon an annual parallax shift of 25.33 mas as seen from Earth, this star is located roughly 129 light years from the Sun. It is moving closer to the Sun with a radial velocity of −29 km/s.

This is an evolved, yellow-hued giant of spectral type K0 III around 2.16 times as massive as the Sun that has swollen to a diameter 10 times that of the Sun. It is a red clump star on the horizontal branch, which indicates it is generating energy through helium fusion at its core. The star is radiating 51 times the Sun's luminosity from its enlarged photosphere at an effective temperature of 4,699 K.

Gamma2 Normae is a close double, with a magnitude 10 companion. The pair has been previously identified as a binary star system, but the second release of Gaia data showed the companion star to be much more distant.

γ1 Nor is a yellow supergiant located nearby on the celestial sphere, but is much further away from Earth and nearly a magnitude fainter.

References

K-type giants
Horizontal-branch stars
Norma (constellation)
Normae, Gamma2
Durchmusterung objects
9554
146686
080000
6072